William Mawson  (17 May 1828 – 25 April 1889) was an English architect best known for his work in and around Bradford.

Background
Mawson was born in Leeds on 17 May 1828 to parents William and Mary Mawson. His father was a prominent paper manufacturer and councilor in Leeds.

William Mawson moved from Leeds to Bradford, after he finished his articles in late 1840s. At that time he was aged 21 and in 1849 he became a partner of the older Henry Francis Lockwood. Initially Mawson lived with his eldest brother Henry and his family at 27 Hanover Square, Bradford. Henry Mawson was a bookseller and printer with a business in Kirkgate Bradford. Also living in this house was their sister, Mary Ann Mawson, whose son Francis Mawson Rattenbury was articled to Mawson and who was to become a famous architect in Canada and who was subsequently murdered by his wife and young chauffeur in the famous case of 1935.

Mawson died in 1889 and spent the last twenty years of his life living at 3 Clifton Villas, Bradford with his mother – until she died in 1881 – and his brother Richard. William and Richard never married.

William Mawson, along with his brother Richard and his mother Mary Mawson, is buried in Undercliffe Cemetery where the imposing Egyptian obelisk with a bronze portrait of William is situated on the main terrace. It is a Grade II listed monument.

Lockwood and Mawson 
The foundation of Mawson’s success as an architect was his partnership with Francis Lockwood in the firm of ‘Lockwood and Mawson’. Lockwood and Mawson transformed Bradford in period 1850 -1875 as this period saw Bradford grow at an unprecedented rate. This mercurial growth demanded new industrial, residential and civic buildings and the firm was instrumental in helping to drive this building boom in the years between 1850 and 1875.

Lockwood and Mawson's success was due to three factors. Firstly, the three main architects – Lockwood and the Mawson brothers – were all from Yorkshire which appealed to local businessmen. Secondly, they were situated in Bradford when architects were most needed as the town boomed.  Thirdly, they worked well together: Lockwood was the most architecturally talented; William Mawson was known for his practical ability; Richard Mawson was a social asset and a fine sportsman who made the important friends and contacts.

With the death of Lockwood in 1878 the firm was renamed W & R Mawson with William’s brother, Richard Mawson (1834–1904), becoming the second partner.  With the death of Lockwood the partnership lost its creativity. A young Francis Mawson Rattenbury joined the firm in 1886 as a student but during the six years he was with them the company made little impact or designed buildings of importance. The business address of the partnership was The Exchange Buildings, Bradford, West Yorkshire.

Buildings 

In 1849 Lockwood and Mawson won a competition against twenty-one other entrants to design St George's Hall. St George’s Hall is the oldest concert hall still in use in Britain. It was built of sandstone masonry in neoclassic style and was opened on 29 August 1853. The total cost of the building works was £35,000 and the venue initially seated 3,500 people. It is a Grade II* listed building.

In 1850 the enterprising and innovative mill owner Titus Salt turned to the partnership to plan and design a large mill and model village. This became Saltaire which is now a UNESCO World Heritage Site due to its international influence as it was innovative and progressive project. Lockwood and Mawson designed the entire village in a classical style that had been inspired by the Renaissance. Their outstanding individual work is the Saltaire United Reformed Church which is a Grade I listed building. They designed housing to the highest quality with every house having a water supply, gas lighting, an outdoor privy, separate living and cooking spaces. Most other workers at this time would be living in dark hovels with no such facilities. The streets in Saltaire are named after Titus Salt’s family and members of the Royal Family with the notable exception of two streets which are named after William Mawson and Francis Lockwood.

Lockwood and Mawson were very busy during this period and designed many prominent buildings in Bradford including Bradford City Hall in open competition and the Wool Exchange also in open competition. The City Hall opened in 1873. Its most notable feature is the magnificent clock tower which is Italianate inspired by the Palazzo Vecchio in Florence. The Wool Exchange was built between 1864 and 1867 with the foundation being laid by the Prime Minister of the day, Lord Palmerston. It was designed in ornate Venetian Gothic style. Both Bradford City Hall and Wool Exchange are Grade I listed buildings.

Lockwood and Mawson designed many other prominent buildings in Bradford and most of their buildings are still in use with many being listed.

Citations

Bibliography 

Jackson, N; Lintonbon, J; Staples, B: (2010): 'Saltaire: The Making of a Model Town', Spire Books, 

Brodie, A (ed), 'Directory of British Architects, 1834–1914; Vol 2 (L-Z) British Architect Library, Royal Institute of British Architects.

Robinson, A.H., 1971, 'Lockwood and Mawson. The Story of a Great Partnership." Bradford Bystander 1971

1828 births
1889 deaths
Architects from Bradford